Alexander George Goot (born March 15, 1988) is a singer-songwriter and multi-instrumentalist from New York City. , his YouTube channel GootMusic has 3.75 million subscribers and more than 800 million total views. He plays acoustic guitar, bass guitar, piano, drums and other instruments.

Biography and career

Goot began recording music in 2004 at the age of 16 and since then has gained popularity from his profiles on various social network sites as well as his own website, from which Alex distributes some of his music and provides news and regular updates. His time is almost all spent in his home studio self-producing all audio and video for his releases, or touring the world.

Goot released his first studio album In Your Atmosphere,  which was made possible by his fans via an extremely successful Kickstarter campaign. His YouTube channel has about 3,000,000 subscribers and his videos have been viewed over 800 million times.

Goot first recorded his music and videos for many years in his home studio in Poughkeepsie, he moved in early February 2015, immediately after his European tour in January 2015, to Los Angeles.

Goot has made several videos in collaboration with other artists such as We Are the in Crowd, Kurt Hugo Schneider, Megan Nicole, Sam Tsui and Against the Current.

Goot has released four volumes of Songs I Wish I Wrote with most of the versions of his channel on YouTube.

Personal life
Alexander Gut was born in Wisconsin, and he grew up in Vermont and New York state. He became engaged to his girlfriend of two years, Elle Fowler, on July 3, 2015. Alex proposed on the beach, wrote the song "Unstoppable" about her, and played it during the proposal. On June 19, 2016, Goot and Elle Fowler married in Bacara Resort & Spa in Santa Barbara, California. On June 21, 2018, they announced the birth of their son, James Alexander Goot.

Discography

Studio albums of original songs
2005: 158 (released under the artist name "Goot")
2008: Arranged Noise (released under the artist name "Goot")
2012: In Your Atmosphere
2013: In Your Atmosphere (Deluxe Edition) (4 additional tracks)
2014: Wake Up Call

Studio albums of cover songs
Songs I Wish I Wrote
2010: Songs I Wish I Wrote
2011: Songs I Wish I Wrote, Vol. 2
2012: Songs I Wish I Wrote, Vol. 3
2014: Songs I Wish I Wrote, Vol. 4
2015: Songs I Wish I Wrote: Unplugged

Alex Goot & Friends
2012: Alex Goot & Friends, Vol. 1
2012: Alex Goot & Friends, Vol. 2
2014: Alex Goot & Friends, Vol. 3
2015: Alex Goot & Friends, Vol. 4
2017: Alex Goot & Friends, Vol. 5

EPs
2007: Asleep at the Wheel (released under the artist name "Goot")
2008: Progress – EP (released under the artist name "Goot")
2009: Take Cover (released under the artist name "Goot")
2009: Read My Mind (released under the artist name "Goot")
2010: Sensitivity EP
2014: Wake Up Call

Singles
2010: Breathless
2010: Next Christmas Eve
2011: Pretty Eyes
2011: Sensitivity
2011: We Could Love
2012: Bright Lights (Fly)
2012: The Real You
2012: Lightning
2013: We Could Love
2013: Secret Girl
2013: Living Addiction
2014: Just To Shine
2014: Wake Up Call
2014: Right Where I Belong
2015: Unstoppable
2016: Helium
2018: Fix You

Awards and nominations

External links
 Alex Goot YouTube Channel

References 

21st-century American singers
Musicians from Poughkeepsie, New York
American male singer-songwriters
American pop pianists
American male pianists
American acoustic guitarists
American male bass guitarists
American pop guitarists
1988 births
Living people
American YouTubers
American male pop singers
Guitarists from New York (state)
21st-century American drummers
21st-century American pianists
21st-century American bass guitarists
21st-century American male singers
Singer-songwriters from New York (state)